Citharexylum spinosum is a species of flowering plant in the family Verbenaceae that is native to southern Florida in the United States, the Caribbean, Guyana, Suriname, and Venezuela. Common names include Florida fiddlewood and spiny fiddlewood.

Description
Small white flowers are produced throughout the year on hanging axillary and terminal racemes and panicles  in length. The fruit are red to black subglobose drupes  in diameter.

References

External links

spinosum
Plants described in 1753
Taxa named by Carl Linnaeus
Trees of the Caribbean
Trees of the Dominican Republic
Flora of the Dominican Republic
Trees of the Southeastern United States
Trees of Guyana
Trees of Suriname
Trees of Venezuela